St John Henry Newman Catholic School is a coeducational Roman Catholic secondary school and sixth form. It is located in Carlisle in the English county of Cumbria.

It is a Voluntary aided school administered by Cumbria County Council and the Roman Catholic Diocese of Lancaster. The school is named after Cardinal John Henry Newman.

St John Henry Newman Catholic School offers GCSEs and BTECs as programmes of study for pupils, while students in the sixth form have the option to study from a range of A-levels and further BTECs.

Notable former pupils
Matt Jansen, footballer 
Rumer, singer-songwriter

References

External links
St John Henry Newman Catholic School official website

Secondary schools in Cumbria
Catholic secondary schools in the Diocese of Lancaster
Voluntary aided schools in England